Avula Parthasarathy, popularly known as Swamiji (born 8 June 1927), is an Indian philosopher and exponent of Vedanta, one of the ancient philosophies of India. He translates the subtle philosophical themes into a practical technique of living. He has multiple degrees in literature, science and law, and completed a postgraduate degree in international law from London University. Renouncing a shipping business early in life, he has dedicated his life to study, research and propagation of Vedanta. His writings, discourses and seminars have featured in international press and television media. Business, sport and film celebrities regularly seek his counsel.

Vedanta 
Vedanta is derived from two words, veda knowledge and anta end. Vedanta means the culmination of knowledge. It presents eternal principles of life and living, equips one with the strength of intellect to meet challenges and live a life of action and peace. Above all, its philosophy leads one to the ultimate goal of Self-Realisation.

Lifetime  
At 94 years, Swamiji follows a daily schedule of yoga and jogging. He is also an accomplished sportsman, regularly winning most-valuable player awards for his Academy cricket team.

In over five decades of service, Swamiji's contribution has been the translation of subtle philosophical themes into practical techniques of living. An exercise that has reduced stress and increased productivity among human beings.

His personality and lifetime effort has been profiled in books prescribed for students in India:

Books 
Swamiji has written twelve books, including three best sellers. The Complete Works of Swami Parthasarathy was released in 2012 as a single book. It contains all of Swamiji's publications:

 The Fall of the Human Intellect
 The Holocaust of Attachment
 Governing Business & Relationships
 Select English Poems
 Vedanta Treatise: The Eternities
 Bhaja Govindam
 Atmabodha
 Bhagavad Gita
 Choice Upanishads
 The Symbolism of Hindu Gods and Rituals
 Thesis on God
 Citations Tributes Quotes

Vedanta Academy 
In 1988, he founded the Vedanta Academy which runs continual three-year residential courses to disseminate Vedanta to students from India and abroad.

The Vedanta Academy offers three year full-time residential courses for students regardless of race or religion. They are taught a range of texts on Vedanta philosophy which includes select works from English literature and poetry as well. The Academy's educational system is focused on the development of the human intellect and not merely providing intelligence on a subject. The medium of instruction is English with a module in Sanskrit language. On completion graduates are awarded a diploma in Vedanta philosophy.

Corporate guru 
Swamiji's lifetime research has formulated Self-management courses for corporations worldwide. He has been acclaimed as one of the leading corporate gurus for international institutions such as the Young Entrepreneurs' Organisation, Young Presidents' Organisation, World Presidents' Organisation, World Economic Forum and distinguished business schools.

Self-management 
After decades of research, Swami Parthasarathy has developed practical techniques of Self-Management that increase productivity, reduce stress and develop the essential components of leadership.

His teachings develop the clarity in thinking needed to
 Reduce stress in everyday living
 Increase productivity at work
 Maintain harmony in relationships
 Master the technique of living

Speeches 
He has spoken to
 The Festival of Thinkers as a keynote speaker alongside sixteen Nobel laureates
 The Aspen Ideas Festival, also as a keynote
 The Young Presidents' Organization 
 The World Presidents' Organization 
 The World Economic Forum
 Harvard
 Wharton
 NASA
 Microsoft
 Ford
 Indian cricket team

Press coverage 
Swami Parthasarathy has been featured in print and electronic media worldwide including 
Time
The New Yorker
BusinessWeek 
CNBC
The Sunday Times
New York Post
The Times of India

References

External links
 Vedanta Academy
 Vedanta Live Course
 "Applying Swami Parthasarathy's Vedanta to Boardrooms". Forbes India. 0February 20, 2013).
 "Swami, How They Love Ya". Time. (October 18, 2007).

1920s births
Living people
20th-century Indian philosophers
Vedanta
Alumni of the University of London